Andrews Tetteh (born 25 May 2001) is a Greek-Ghanaian professional footballer who plays as a forward for Greek Super League 2 club Kifisia.

References

2001 births
Living people
Ghanaian footballers
Super League Greece 2 players
Gamma Ethniki players
A.E. Kifisia F.C. players
Association football forwards